Picrodendron is a genus of plant in the family Picrodendraceae, described in 1859. It contains one species, Picrodendron baccatum, native to the West Indies (Bahamas, Cayman Islands, Cuba, Hispaniola, Jamaica and the Swan Islands of Honduras).

See also
Taxonomy of the Picrodendraceae

References

Picrodendraceae
Monotypic Malpighiales genera